Valsecca was a comune (municipality) in the Province of Bergamo in the Italian region of Lombardy, located about  northeast of Milan and about  northwest of Bergamo. In 2014 it was merged into the comune of Sant'Omobono Terme.

References

Former municipalities of Lombardy